Norman law refers to the customary law of the Duchy of Normandy which developed between the 10th and 13th centuries and which survives today in the legal systems of Jersey and the other Channel Islands. It grew out of a mingling of Frankish customs and Viking ones after the creation of Normandy as a Norse colony under French rule in 911.

There are traces of (Anglo-)Scandinavian law in the customary laws of Normandy. A charter of 1050 (Cartulaire Saint-Pierre-de-Préaux, concerning the land of Vascœuil), listing several pleas before Duke William II, refers to the penalty of banishment as ullac "(put) out of law" (from Old Norse útlagr "(be) banished"), well attested in the Norwegian and Anglo-Saxon laws as utlah and those sentenced for ullac are called ulages (< útlagi "outlaws"). The word was still current in the 12th century, when it was used in the Roman de Rou by Wace. Another word mentioned in the same charter is hanfare (or hainfare, haimfare, hamfare < Old Norse heimför) which punishes the offense of invasio domus, known mainly in England as hamsocn. In the Très ancien Coutumier (1218 - 1223) this crime is called in Latin assultus intra quatuor pertica domus "assault inside the house".

Marriage more danico ("in the Danish manner"), that is, without any ecclesiastical ceremony in accordance with old Norse custom, was recognised as legal in Normandy and in the Norman church. The first three dukes of Normandy all practised it.

Scandinavian influence is especially apparent in laws relating to waters. The duke possessed the droit de varech (from Old Norse vágrek, influenced phonetically *vreki "wreck"), the right to all shipwrecks. He also had a monopoly on whale and sturgeon. A similar monopoly belonged to the Danish king in the Jutlandic law of 1241. The Norman Latin terms for whalers (valmanni, from hvalmenn) and whaling station (valseta, from hvalmannasetr) both derive from Old Norse. Likewise, fishing seems to have come under Scandinavian rules. A charter of 1030 uses the term fisigardum (from Old Norse fiskigarðr) for "fisheries", a term also found in the Scanian law of c. 1210.

Norman customary law was first written down in two customaries in Latin by two judges for use by them and their colleagues: the Très ancien coutumier (Very ancient customary) authored between 1200 and 1245; and the Grand coutumier de Normandie (Great customary of Normandy, originally Summa de legibus Normanniae in curia laïcali) authored between 1235 and 1245.

The Channel Islands remained part of the Duchy of Normandy until 1204 when King Philip II Augustus of France conquered the duchy from King John of England. The islands remained in the personal possession of the King of England and were described as being a Peculiar of the Crown. They retained the Norman customary law and developed it in parallel with continental Normandy and France, albeit with different evolutions.

See also
Clameur de haro

References

External links

An Introduction to the History of Guernsey Law
 Jersey Legal System and Constitutional Law (Institute of Law, Jersey, 2011) 

Normandy
Legal history of France
Customary legal systems
Duchy of Normandy